Ian Comyn Fraser (25 August 1902 – 2 February 1990) was a New Zealand cricketer. He played one first-class match for Otago in 1918/19.

Fraser was born ar Inverness in Scotland in 1902. He was educated at Otago Boys' High School and later qualified as a doctor. As well as cricket, Fraser played association football for Otago.

References

External links
 

1902 births
1990 deaths
New Zealand cricketers
Otago cricketers
Cricketers from Inverness
Scottish emigrants to New Zealand